MCN may refer to:

Media
 MCN (journal), a peer-reviewed journal of obstetrical and neonatal nursing
 Multi-channel network, a type of organization working with video platforms to assist their owners
 Metro Chinese Network, a Rockville, Maryland Chinese-language TV station
 Music Center the Netherlands, promotes and archives Dutch professional music
 Motor Cycle News, a British motorcycling newspaper
 Motorcycle Consumer News, American motorcycling monthly

Organizations

Government
 Muscogee (Creek) Nation, a federally recognized Native American tribe based in the U.S. state of Oklahoma

Military
 Military Counseling Network, a free source of information for U.S military concerning regulations and discharges
 Mountain Corps Norway, a German army unit during World War II
 Multinational Corps Northeast, military group in Szczecin, Poland

Computing and technology
 Melbourne Centre for Nanofabrication, nanotechnology headquarters in Victoria, Australia
 Microcomputer Club Nederland,  Dutch computer club in the 1980s–90s
 Museum Computer Network, concentrates on use of computer technology for museums
 Media Catalog Number, a type of Compact Disc subcode

Transportation
 Machynlleth railway station, National Rail station code
 Middle Georgia Regional Airport, IATA airport code

Medicine 

Pancreatic mucinous cystic neoplasm, type of cystic lesion that occurs in the pancreas